Nehzom-e Seyqal Kumeh (also Romanized as Nehzom-e Şeyqal Kūmeh; also known as Nehzom) is a village in Jirdeh Rural District, in the Central District of Shaft County, Gilan Province, Iran. At the 2006 census, its population was 593, in 138 families.

References 

Populated places in Shaft County